The 2015 FIA WTCC Race of Argentina was the opening round of the 2015 World Touring Car Championship season and the third running of the FIA WTCC Race of Argentina. It was held on 8 March 2015 at the Autódromo Termas de Río Hondo in Termas de Río Hondo, Santiago del Estero Province, Argentina.

Both races were won by Citroën Total WTCC with race one won by José María López and race two won by Sébastien Loeb.

Background
A total of eighteen cars were entered for the first round of the season, all built to the TC1 regulations introduced the previous year. With this the Yokohama Trophy rules were changed to reward the best placed driver from an independent team. Unlike previous seasons, certain drivers were not eliminated from this trophy based on previous career accomplishments.

Report

Testing and free practice
Sébastien Loeb set the pace in testing on Friday in damp conditions. Mehdi Bennani was the fastest independent driver in fifth.

First free practice on Saturday morning saw reigning champion José María López set the fastest time. The session was interrupted by a red flag when Tom Chilton's ROAL Motorsport Chevrolet suffered a left–front puncture.

López topped the times once again in free practice two with Ma Qing Hua and Yvan Muller making it a Citroën 1–2–3. Hugo Valente suffered brake failure and damaged his engine by downshifting in an attempt to stop; the car subsequently caught fire.

Qualifying
Prior to the first session starting, it was confirmed that the Campos Racing car of Valente would miss qualifying following his practice shunt; the car required a substantial rebuild, due to the damage suffered.

In the first part of qualifying, Lada Sport Rosneft's Robert Huff was the quickest driver ahead of the privateer Citroën of Bennani. Norbert Michelisz lost his front-right wheel on his first attempt at a flying lap, suffering damage that put him out of the rest of the session and he would line up on the back row for both races.

Ma topped the times in the second part of qualifying and along with López, Muller, Tiago Monteiro and Sébastien Loeb would continue to the Q3 segment. James Thompson was tenth and would line up on pole for race two.

Q3 saw López claim pole position by 1.2 seconds over Muller with Loeb, Ma and Monteiro completing the top five.

Race One
Muller jumped ahead of López briefly at the start while Ma failed to get going off the line and Chilton dived around him. Muller ran out wide on the exit of turn one and López retook first place. Thompson and Campos' John Filippi were out on the first lap with broken suspension on both of their cars after making contact. On lap three Chilton was under attack from Bennani until the Moroccan driver slid and gave Huff a chance to move up to seventh place. Later on in the lap Bennani was attempting to pass Huff up the inside and collided with the rear of the Lada, breaking the right–rear suspension. On lap four Valente went off and crashed into the barriers which brought his race to an end. Bennani was held up by Chilton until lap six when the defensive driving of Chilton had reduced the grip his tyres, following Bennani through were Michelisz and the recovering Ma. Lap eight saw Bennani given a drive–through penalty for his earlier collision with Huff, moving Michelisz up to sixth and Rickard Rydell into the top ten. López won the race by 3.1 seconds from Muller with Loeb completing a Citroën 1–2–3, Michelisz was the winning Yokohama independent driver.

Race Two
After their collisions in the first race, neither Huff nor Valente made the start of the race. Thompson dropped down the order at the start as Tom Coronel moved into the lead from second, followed by the two factory Hondas and Stefano D'Aste who followed Gabriele Tarquini in running off the track onto the grass. By the end of the back straight Ma was up to third behind Monteiro and at the end of the lap both Ma and Loeb led Coronel. The second lap saw Loeb take the lead of the race after a mistake by Ma as López picked off Monteiro and closed in on the back of Coronel. Thompson pulled into the pits at the end of the first lap while Coronel went off the circuit dropping him further down the order and collecting grass in his radiator grill. The safety car came out on lap three due to spilt oil on the exit of turn two as the stranded car of D'Aste was towed off the circuit. During the safety car period Ma pitted due to overheating and to have his radiator cleaned out, dropping him to the back of the field. The race resumed on lap six and López used his straight line speed advantage to pick off Tarquini on the back straight and leaving Tarquini to deal with Muller behind. The start of lap seven saw Chilton take Dušan Borković for eighth with Rydell following him through, Borković then dropped a wheel off the track and ripped the front bumper of his Proteam Racing Honda off on the kerbing. Lap ten saw Muller run into the right–rear end of Bennani as both pursued Tarquini; Bennani dropped from fourth to seventh as a result. Muller continued to have problems when he drifted wide and lost a place to Monteiro, Muller went into the pits on lap twelve for repairs. Loeb comfortably beat López to win the race, Monteiro took the final podium place and Bennani in fifth was the Yokohama Trophy winner.

After the race, Muller was given a five–place grid drop for the next race in Morocco for causing the collision with Bennani. Michelisz was dropped a place in the results for a collision with Ma near the end of the race.

Results

Qualifying

Bold denotes Pole position for second race.

Race 1

Bold denotes Fastest lap.

Race 2

Bold denotes Fastest lap.

 — Michelisz was dropped one place in the final classification for a collision with Ma.

Standings after the event

Drivers' Championship standings

Yokohama Trophy standings

Manufacturers' Championship standings

 Note: Only the top five positions are included for both sets of drivers' standings.

References

External links
World Touring Car Championship official website

Argentina
FIA WTCC Race of Argentina